The Koiarian languages   Koiari are a small family of Trans–New Guinea languages spoken in the "Bird's Tail" (southeastern peninsula) of New Guinea. They are classified within the Southeast Papuan branch of Trans–New Guinea.

Languages
The languages are: 
 Koiaric branch (Koiari): Grass Koiari, Mountain Koiari–Koitabu
 Baraic branch (Managalas Plateau): Barai–Namiae, Ese (Managalasi), Ömie

Dutton (2010) classifies the Koiarian languages as:

Baraic
Ömie
Barai–Managalasi (incl. Namiae)
Koiaric
Mountain Koiari
Koita – Grass Koiari

Proto-language

Pronouns
Usher (2020) reconstructs the pronouns as:
{| 
! !!sg!!pl
|-
!1
|*na ||*no
|-
!2
|*a ||*ja
|-
!3
|*aɸu ||*[i/e]abu
|}

Vocabulary
The following basic vocabulary words of Proto-Koiarian and other lower-level reconstructions are from the Trans-New Guinea database:

{| class="wikitable sortable"
! gloss !! Proto-Koiarian !! Proto-Koiariac !! Proto-Baraic
|-
! head
|  || *kina || 
|-
! hair
| *fómo ||  || 
|-
! ear
|  ||  || *gada
|-
! eye
| *ni ||  || 
|-
! nose
| *uri ||  || 
|-
! tooth
|  ||  || *gubai
|-
! tongue
|  ||  || *bitarV
|-
! leg
|  ||  || *díʔ-
|-
! louse
| *ʔumu ||  || 
|-
! dog
|  || *to || *(ʔ,k)uo
|-
! pig
|  || *ofo || *mafV
|-
! bird
| *ugu[fa] ||  || 
|-
! egg
| *uni ||  || 
|-
! blood
| *taɣo ||  || 
|-
! bone
|  ||  || *(ʔ)adV
|-
! skin
| *vata ||  || 
|-
! breast
| *amu ||  || *m(u,o)sV
|-
! tree
| *idí ||  || 
|-
! man
|  || *ata || *baru
|-
! woman
| *maɣina || *nigi || 
|-
! sun
|  || *vani || *maja-; *ve
|-
! moon
|  || *bata || 
|-
! water
|  ||  || *[i]do
|-
! fire
| *vené ||  || 
|-
! stone
| *muni ||  || 
|-
! road, path
|  || *ɣuma || 
|-
! name
| *ifí ||  || 
|-
! eat
| *i- ||  || 
|-
! one
| *(i,o)gau ||  || 
|-
! two
|  || *abu(t)i || *inoki
|}

Evolution
Koiarian reflexes of proto-Trans-New Guinea (pTNG) etyma are:

Koiari language:
muka ‘lump’ < *maŋgV ‘round object’
uni ‘egg’ < *mun(a,i,u)ka
idu ‘tree’ < *inda
iya ‘cassowary’ < *ku(y)a
karika ‘dry’ < *(ŋg,k)atata
muni ‘stone < *(na)muna
nana ‘older same-sex sibling’ < *nan(a,i)
u-tuvu ‘ashes’ < *kambu-sumbu

Managalasi language:
ata ‘bone’ < *kondaC
muka ‘lump’ < *maŋgV ‘round object’
iha ‘name’ < *imbi
uma ‘louse’ < *iman
uka ‘bird’ < *yaka
tuua ‘short’ < *tukumba[C]
muna ‘stone’ < *(na)muna
ija ‘tree’ < *inda
otoka ‘knee’ < *(k,ŋg)atuk
kora ‘dry’ < *(ŋg,k)atata

Phonotactics
Like the Binanderean languages, Barai and other Koiarian languages only allow for open syllables and do not allow final CVC.

References

Further reading
Dutton, Tom. 2003. A dictionary of Koiari, Papua New Guinea, with grammar notes. Pacific Linguistics 534. Canberra: Australian National University.
Proto-Koiarian. TransNewGuinea.org. From Dutton, T.E. 2010. Reconstructing Proto Koiarian: The history of a Papuan language family, Canberra: Pacific Linguistics.
Proto-Koiariac. TransNewGuinea.org. From Dutton, T.E. 2010. Reconstructing Proto Koiarian: The history of a Papuan language family, Canberra: Pacific Linguistics.
Proto-Baraic. TransNewGuinea.org. From Dutton, T.E. 2010. Reconstructing Proto Koiarian: The history of a Papuan language family, Canberra: Pacific Linguistics.

 
Owen Stanley Range languages
Languages of Central Province (Papua New Guinea)
Languages of Oro Province